Madaripur-2 is a constituency represented in the Jatiya Sangsad (National Parliament) of Bangladesh since 1986 by Shajahan Khan of the Awami League.

Boundaries 
The constituency encompasses Rajoir Upazila, Madaripur Municipality, and ten union parishads of Madaripur Sadar Upazila: Bahadurpur, Chilar Char, Dhurail, Dudkhali, Kalikapur, Kunia, Panchokhola, Pearpur, Rasti, and Sirkhara.

History 
The constituency was created in 1984 from a Faridpur constituency when the former Faridpur District was split into five districts: Rajbari, Faridpur, Gopalganj, Madaripur, and Shariatpur.

Members of Parliament

Elections

Elections in the 2010s 
Shajahan Khan was re-elected unopposed in the 2014 general election after opposition parties withdrew their candidacies in a boycott of the election.

Elections in the 2000s

Elections in the 1990s 

Abdur Razzak stood for two seats in the 1991 general election: Madaripur-2 and Shariatpur-3. After winning both, he chose to represent Shariatpur-3 and quit Madaripur-2, triggering a by-election in it. Shajahan Khan of the Awami League was elected in a September 1991 by-election.

References

External links
 

Parliamentary constituencies in Bangladesh
Madaripur District